The following is a list of Catholic educational institutions located within the Roman Catholic Diocese of Green Bay:

Colleges and universities

Secondary schools

Primary schools

School systems

References

Green Bay
Schools in Wisconsin
Lists of Catholic schools in the United States